Square foot gardening is the practice of dividing the growing area into small square sections, typically  on a side, hence the name.  The aim is to assist the planning and creating of a small but intensively planted vegetable garden.  It results in a simple and orderly gardening system, from which it draws much of its appeal.  Mel Bartholomew coined the term "square foot gardening" in his 1981 book of the same name.

Overview

The phrase "square foot gardening" was popularized by Mel Bartholomew in a 1981 Rodale, Inc. book and subsequent PBS television series. Bartholomew, a retired engineer, devised a raised  square bed with a grid. Each of these 4 by 4 square beds was then divided into sixteen one-foot squares, the grid. Each square is planted with a different crop species based on a formulation of either one, four, nine or sixteen plants per square depending on the plant's overall size. Once a “square foot” is harvested, a different crop can be planted for a continual harvest.
To encourage a variety of different crops in succession, and to discourage pests, each square is used for a different kind of plant (crop rotation) within the growing season. The number of plants per square depends on an individual plant's size. For example, a single tomato plant takes a full square, as might herbs such as oregano, basil or mint, while lettuce plants would be planted four per square, and up to sixteen per square of plants such as radish or carrots. Tall plants are trellised on the north side (in the northern hemisphere) of the bed to avoid shading smaller plants and prevent sprawling on the ground.

One advantage of densely planted crops is that they can form a living mulch and can also prevent weeds from establishing or even germinating. Also, natural insect repellent methods such as companion planting (e.g. planting marigolds or other naturally pest-repelling plants) become more efficient in a close space, which may reduce the need to use pesticides. The large variety of crops in a small space also prevents plant diseases from spreading easily

Since the beds are typically small, making covers or cages to protect plants from pests, cold, wind or too much sun is more practical than with larger gardens. To extend the growing season of a square foot garden, a cold/hot frame may be built around it, and by facing the cold/hot frame south, the SFG captures more light and heat during the colder months of spring and winter.

In 2006 Bartholemew updated the concept with the book "All New Square Foot Gardening", which advocates using “Mel’s Mix” created by Bartholomew. After much experimentation, Bartholomew concluded that his formulation of 1/3 peat moss or coconut coir, 1/3 vermiculite and 1/3 blended compost yielded superior results in only a  depth. The benefits of the mix included keeping soil friable and virtually weed free with all the necessary nutrients. This mix eliminated the need for artificial fertilizer as compost is added each time you re-plant a square which provides enough nutrients naturally.

See also
 Companion planting
 French intensive gardening
 Organic gardening
 Raised bed gardening

References

Further reading

External links

 Square Foot Gardening Foundation
 Vinegar in Garden
 Step By Step Square Foot Gardening

Gardening books
Gardening television
Organic gardening